Marcos Javier Acuña (born 28 October 1991) is an Argentine professional footballer who plays as a left back for La Liga club Sevilla and the Argentina national team. Ele é considerado um dos melhores laterais do mundo.

Club career

Early career
Acuña began his athletic training at Club Don Bosco in his hometown. At that time he played as a left wing-back. His good performance got him noticed by scouts who invited him to perform tests at various clubs in Buenos Aires. Thus, at age 13 he tried out for but did not stay at Boca Juniors and San Lorenzo de Almagro. Four years later he tried out for Quilmes, River Plate and Tigre before ultimately being taken by Ferro Carril Oeste. After a few seasons in Ferro's reserve team, he was promoted to the first team. He made his debut in 2009 in a match in the Primera B Nacional playing as a winger under coach José María Bianco. Already in the 2013–14 season he stood out for his ability to assist his peers, providing 12 assists, which caught the attention of major clubs. At Ferro, Acuña played a total of 117 matches, with 5 goals and 23 assists.

Racing Club
On 18 July 2014, Acuña moved to Racing Club for a net fee of 4,900,000 pesos for 50% of his rights, with the option to buy another 25% at $750,000. On 27 July 2014, he played his first game with the Academia in a match for the knockout phase of the 2013–14 Copa Argentina against San Martín de San Juan, in which he also scored the winning goal on a header to give Racing a 1–0 victory. Later that year he was part of Racing's championship team that won the 2014 Argentine Primera División, cutting a streak of 13 years without titles for the Avellaneda side, in which Acuña played 15 games and scored two goals.

Sporting CP
On 12 June 2017, Racing president Víctor Blanco confirmed that Acuña would be leaving the club for Sporting CP. He made his debut for the Portuguese team in a 2–0 away victory over Desportivo Aves. On 15 May 2018, Acuña and several of his teammates, including coaches, were injured following an attack by around 50 supporters of Sporting at the club's training ground after the team finished third in the league and missed out on the UEFA Champions League qualification. Despite the attack, he and the rest of the team agreed to play in the Portuguese Cup final scheduled for the following weekend, eventually losing to C.D. Aves.

Sevilla
On 14 September 2020, Acuña joined Spanish club Sevilla on a four-year deal. On 7 November 2021, Acuña scored his first league goal of the 2021–22 season in the el gran derbi where Sevilla won 2–0 against Real Betis.
On 13 February 2021, he extended his contract with Sevilla until 2025.

International career
On 15 November 2016, Acuña made his international debut with the Argentina national team in a World Cup Qualifier 2018 match against Colombia. He was part of Argentina's squad that won the 2021 Copa América.

Acuña represented Argentina in the 2018 World Cup in Russia and the 2022 World Cup in Qatar. He won the latter edition of the tournament, playing all games except for the semifinal against Croatia in which he was suspended.

Career statistics

Club

International

Honours
Racing Club
Argentine Primera División: 2014

Sporting CP
Taça de Portugal: 2018–19
Taça da Liga: 2017–18, 2018–19

Argentina
FIFA World Cup: 2022
Copa América: 2021
CONMEBOL–UEFA Cup of Champions: 2022

Individual

Argentine Primera División Top assist provider: 2016–17 
 La Liga Team of the Season: 2021–22

References

External links

Profile at the Sevilla FC website

Living people
1991 births
People from Neuquén Province
Argentine footballers
Association football fullbacks
Argentina international footballers
FIFA World Cup-winning players
Copa América-winning players
2018 FIFA World Cup players
2019 Copa América players
2021 Copa América players
2022 FIFA World Cup players
Ferro Carril Oeste footballers
Racing Club de Avellaneda footballers
Sporting CP footballers
Sevilla FC players
Argentine Primera División players
Primera Nacional players
Primeira Liga players
La Liga players
Argentine expatriate footballers
Expatriate footballers in Portugal
Expatriate footballers in Spain
Argentine expatriate sportspeople in Portugal
Argentine expatriate sportspeople in Spain